Imbach is a surname. Notable people with the surname include:

Thomas Imbach (born 1962), Swiss film director
Josef Imbach (athlete) (1894–1964), Swiss sprinter
Josef Imbach (theologian) (born 1945), Swiss theologian

See also 
Imsbach, is a municipality in the Donnersbergkreis district, in Rhineland-Palatinate, Germany